Dysstroma hersiliata, the orange-barred carpet moth, is a species of geometrid moth in the family Geometridae. It is found in North America.

The MONA or Hodges number for Dysstroma hersiliata is 7189.

Subspecies
These two subspecies belong to the species Dysstroma hersiliata:
 Dysstroma hersiliata cervinifascia (Walker, 1862)
 Dysstroma hersiliata hersiliata (Guenée in Boisduval & Guenée, 1858)

References

Further reading

External links

 

Hydriomenini
Articles created by Qbugbot
Moths described in 1858